César Manuel Cardoso Matos do Paço (born 21 September 1965) also known as César Do Paço is a Portuguese businessman and former honorary consul for both Portugal and Cape Verde in Palm Coast, Florida. DePaço is the chief executive officer of Summit Nutritionals International. He has close connections through his Foundation DePaço to André Ventura and the CHEGA! far-right political party in Portugal.

In 2019, DePaço became an official patron of FC Porto, a major Portuguese football club. In 2020, DePaço became the owner and official patron of CF Canelas 2010. In April 2020 when he announced his intention to invest in Canelas, he said one of the key goals was to move beyond the club's previous reputation for violence.

Following his tenure as the firstand onlyHonorary Consul of Portugal to Florida, DePaço was appointed to the same position representing Cape Verde. In January 2021, he was dismissed following a scandal which led to the resignation of Cape Verde's Minister of Foreign Affairs, Luis Filipe Tavares.

In January 2021 his lawyer edited his Wikipedia page, attempted vandalism, then proceeded to threaten legal action, if Wikipedia did not remove information he considered fraudulent. This included his proven connections to CHEGA!.

Early life 
DePaço was born in Madalena do Pico, Azores on September 21, 1965. 

His father was the head of an Azorean finance department and, according to DePaço, his entire childhood was spent in the Azores until he was 11 years old, when he emigrated with his family to the United States.

He currently lives with his wife, Deanna Padovani-DePaço, in the state of New Jersey where he founded Summit Nutritionals International and where he is known for several philanthropic activities, namely associated to the support of security forces of several US states.

According to a news article from the Portuguese newspaper Expresso, Caesar DePaço has a degree in Psychology and two doctorates. He was also a professor of Psychology in Bangkok, Thailand, for four years.

Diplomatic Positions 
On 3 October 2014, DePaço was appointed as Honorary Consul of the Portuguese Republic in Florida, based out of the city of Palm Coast. In 2017, DePaço organized the first-ever raising of the Portuguese flag at a government building in Florida, at the Palm Coast City Hall.

DePaço was a finalist for the New Jersey Corporate Citizen of the Year award in 2014, for his and his company's dedication to philanthropic works, particularly those in regards to supporting local law enforcement.

In 2020, DePaço became a member of the advisory board for the Portuguese Criminology Association.

In May 2020, DePaço resigned from his position as Honorary Consul, citing irreconcilable differences with the Portuguese Ambassador to the United States, Domingos Fezas Vital, on matters concerning Portuguese national interest and foreign policy, stating that “I leave because I cannot compromise my principles and I will not overlook unacceptable conduct.”.

Allegations involving Chega

On 11 January 2021, Portuguese news channel SIC Notícias broadcast a story asserting that DePaço had donated over ten thousand euros to Portugal's Chega party, and highlighted connections of several of its leaders to the DePaço Foundation. This was controversial in Cape Verde due to Chega's opposition to immigration.
The day after the SIC story was aired, Cape Verdean Foreign Minister, who had recently appointed DePaço as Honorary Consul of Cape Verde to Florida, resigned. DePaço was subsequently dismissed, At the time he was appointed, Cape Verde already had a consul in Florida.

His wife, Deanna Padovani-DePaço, remains as Honorary Consul of Cape Verde to New Jersey. In an article in January 2021, newspaper "A Nação" questioned the case of a husband and wife being both appointed to as consuls, writing "This is the first time Cape Verde has ever nominated a couple, husband and wife, to consulates in the same country, at once, to different states in the U.S.A".

In late January 2021, DePaço’s attorney Rui Barreira told Macao newspaper Ponto Final that DePaço was not dismissed from his position, but resigned on his own initiative on January 12 in order to avoid becoming a subject of controversy in Cabo Verde. Barreira asserted that DePaço paid for the consular activities out of his own pocket. He also said that DePaço’s Wikipedia biographies had been the target of malicious editing.

In June 2021, Portuguese-American newspaper LusoAmericano reported that DePaço was suing media outlets Sábado magazine, CMTV and SIC for what he called “attacks on his honour and image, due to the imputation of false facts,” specifically that he is the “main financier of Chega,” alleging that this claim had come to overshadow his career in international business in the minds of the Portuguese public. DePaço said that he was never a financier of Chega, having made only one donation to the party within legal limits and otherwise uninvolved either as an activist or a party member. He also filed criminal complaints against Cofina, which owns Sábado and CMTV, Cofina director Eduardo Dâmaso and journalist Alexandre Malhado as well as SIC information directors Ricardo Costa and Marta Reis and journalist Pedro Coelho.

Philanthropy
DePaço has been recognized, primarily across the United States, but also in Europe, for his philanthropic work involving law enforcement in the United States, Portugal, and France. His work has primarily centered around sponsoring or donating K-9 dogs to local police forces across the United States and Europe, including the Guarda Nacional Republicana of Portugal and the Police Nationale of France. Following the November 2015 Paris terrorist attacks, DePaço donated a dog to the French National Police.

In July 2018, the Municipality of Madalena bestowed its golden key to DePaço, in recognition of his philanthropic work and for his contributions to the Azorean community.

DePaço has been made an honorary police officer by the Daytona Beach Police Department, Point Pleasant Beach PD, Linwood PD, DeLand PD, Beachwood PD, and Holmdel Township PD, primarily for his work in support of police forces across the United States. DePaço has also been made honorary chief of police of Hillsborough Township PD, police commissioner of Peapack-Gladstone, New Jersey, deputy sheriff of Bristol County, Massachusetts, as well as an honorary deputy of the sheriff's offices of Flagler County, Florida and Morris County, New Jersey. In 2021, he was appointed as an honorary sheriff with Somerset County Sheriff’s office.

References

External links
 
 Official Twitter
 Personal website

1965 births
Living people
People from Pico Island
Portuguese businesspeople